Messina–Syracuse railway is a railway line in Sicily, Italy.

History 
The line was opened in different parts:

See also 
 List of railway lines in Italy

References

External links 

Railway lines in Sicily
Railway lines opened in 1871